Club Esportiu Alaior is a Spanish football team based in Alaior, Menorca, in the autonomous community of Balearic Islands. Founded in 1934, it plays in Regional Preferente, holding home games at Estadio Los Pinos, with a capacity of 2,500 seats.

History
Alaior is one of several teams that have played most seasons in the fourth division, appearing a total of 47 seasons in the category. 

The club has never qualified for the promotion playoffs to the third level since those were introduced in 1991. Their highest position was second, in the 1989–90 season.

Season to season

47 seasons in Tercera División

External links
Official website 
Futbolme.com profile 
ffib.es profile 

Football clubs in the Balearic Islands
Sport in Menorca
Association football clubs established in 1934
Divisiones Regionales de Fútbol clubs
1934 establishments in Spain